Kaaron Warren is an Australian author of horror, science fiction, and fantasy short stories and novels.

She is the author of the short story collections Through Splintered Walls, The Grinding House, and Dead Sea Fruit. Her short stories have won Australian Shadows Awards, Ditmar Awards and Aurealis Awards.

Her four novels, are Slights, Walking the Tree and Mistification (published by Angry Robot Books) and The Grief Hole (published by IFWG).

Kaaron was Special Guest at the 2013 Australian National Science Fiction Convention.

Bibliography

Novels
 Slights (Angry Robot, July 2009 [UK, Australia]/September 2010 [US/rest of world])  (US)
 Walking the Tree (Angry Robot, February 2010 [UK/Australia]/January 2011 [US/rest of world])  (US)
 Mistification (Angry Robot, June 2011 [UK, Australia]/July 2011 [US/rest of world)  (UK),  (US)
 The Grief Hole (IFWG Publishing Australia, August 2016 [Worldwide-Hardcover August 2016] , [Worldwide -Trade paperback August 2016]  )
 Tide of Stone (Omnium Gatherum Media, April 2018)

Contributed chapters 
 In: Sherlock Holmes: the Australian casebook: all new Holmes stories (Victoria Echo, a division of Bonnier Publishing Australia, November 2017) 
 In: Evil is a matter of perspective: an anthology of antagonists (Grimdark Magazine, April 2017)

Collections
 The Gate Theory (Cohesion Press, 2013)
 Through Splintered Walls (Twelfth Planet Press, 2012)
 The Grinding House (CSFG Publishing, 2005) 
 Dead Sea Fruit (Ticonderoga Publications, 2010)

Short fiction
"White Bed" (1993) in Shrieks
"The Blue Stream" (1994) in Aurealis No. 14 (ed. Stephen Higgins, Dirk Strasser)
"The Salamander" (1994) in Don't Cross the Water and Other Warnings
"Summer Coming" (1994) in Narcissus Magazine No. 10
"The Wrong Seat" (1994) in Calling Up the Devil and Associated Misdemeanours
"The First Interview" (1995) in UQ Social Alternatives Magazine, Volume 14, No. 3
"Loud Music" (1995) in Spies, Lies and Watching Eyes
"The Paper Room" (1995) in Going Down Swinging No. 15
"Skin Holes" (1995) in Strange Fruit (ed. Paul Collins)
"The Hanging People" (1996) in Bloodsongs No. 7 (ed. Steve Proposch)
"A Positive" (1998) in Bloodsongs No. 10
"The Glass Woman" (1998) in Aurealis No. 22 (ed. Stephen Higgins, Dirk Strasser)
"My Smile" (1999) in Nasty Snips (ed. Christopher C. Teague)
"The School Fair" (1999) in Ghosts and Ghoulies (ed. Paul Collins, Meredith Costain)
"The Left Behind" (2000) in Orb Speculative Fiction No. 1 (ed. Sarah Endacott)
"The Speaker of Heaven" (2001) in Orb Speculative Fiction No. 2 (ed. Sarah Endacott)
"Survival of the Last (2001) in Aurealis #27/28 (ed. Dirk Strasser, Stephen Higgins)
"State of Oblivion" (2003) in Elsewhere (ed. Michael Barry)
"Bone Dog" (2003) in Agog! Terrific Tales (ed. Cat Sparks)
"Guarding the Mound" (2004) in Encounters (ed. Maxine McArthur, Donna Maree Hanson)
"The Capture Diamonds" (2005), in Shadow Box
"Doll Money" (2005) in Fables and Reflections, No. 7
"Fresh Young Widow" (2005) in The Grinding House
"The Grinding House" (2005) in The Grinding House
"The Smell of Mice" (2005) in The Grinding House
"Smoke" (2005) in The Grinding House
"Smoko" (2005) in The Grinding House
"The Sameness of Birthdays" (2005) in The Grinding House
"Tiger Kill" (2005) in The Grinding House
"Working for the God of the Love of Money " (2005) in The Grinding House
"Al's Iso Bar" (2005) in The Grinding House
"The Gibbet Bell" (2006) in Borderlands No. 7
"The Softening" (2006) in Shadowed Realms No. 9
"Woman Train" (2006) in The Outcast (ed. Nicole R. Murphy)
"Dead Sea Fruit" (2006) in Fantasy magazine (ed. Sean Wallace)
" Ghost Jail" (2007) in 2012  (ed. Alisa Krasnostein and Ben Payne)
"Cooling the Crows" (2007) in In Bad Dreams, Volume One: Where Real Life Awaits (ed. Mark S. Deniz, Sharyn Lilley)
"Coalescence" (2007) in Aurealis #37 (ed. Stephen Higgins, Stuart Mayne)
"His Lipstick Minx" (2007) in The Workers' Paradise
"Polish" (2007) in Andromeda Spaceways Inflight Magazine No. 28 (ed. Zara Baxter)
"The Census-Taker's Tale" (2008) in Canterbury 2100  (ed. Dirk Flinthart)
"Buster and Corky" (2008) in Scary Food (ed. Cat Sparks)
"Down to the Silver Spirits" (2008) in Paper Cities: An Anthology of Urban Fantasy (ed. Ekaterina Sedia)
"The Edge of a Thing" (2009) in The Edge of a Thing
"Tontine Mary" (2009) in New Ceres Nights (ed. Alisa Krasnostein)
"The Gaze Dogs of Nine Waterfall" (2009) in Exotic Gothic 3 (ed. Danel Olson)
"The Tell" (2009) in Poe (ed. Ellen Datlow)
"That Girl" (2010) in Haunted Legends (ed. Ellen Datlow, Nick Mamatas)
"Hive of Glass" (2010) in Baggage (ed. Gillian Polack)
"The New Rat in Town " (2010) in Worlds Next Door (ed. Tehani Wessely)
"Purity " (2010) in Scenes from the Second Storey (ed. Mark Deniz)
"Loss" (2010) in Sprawl (ed. Alisa Krasnostein)
"Sins of the Ancestors" (2010) in Dead Sea Fruit (ed. Alisa Krasnostein)
"The Coral Gatherer" (2010) in Dead Sea Fruit (ed. Russell Farr)
"The List of Definite Endings" (2011) in Teeth (ed. Ellen Datlow and Terri Windling)
"The Five Loves of Ishtar" (2011) in Ishtar (ed. Amanda Pillar and K. V Taylor)
"All You Can Do Is Breathe" (2011) in Blood and Other Cravings (ed. Ellen Datlow)
"Lucky Fingers" (2011) in Steampunk Cookbook (ed. Sharyn Lilley)
"The Rude Little Girl" (2011) in Black Static Magazine Real Horror issue (ed. Christopher Fowler and Maura McHugh
"The History Thief" (2012) in Visions Fading Fast (ed. Gary McMahon)
"Blame the Neighbours" (2012) in Slices of Flesh (ed. Stan Swanson)
"The River of Memory" (2012) in Robots vs Zombies (ed. Jeff Conner)
"The Pickwick Syndrome" (2012) in Stories of the Smoke (ed. Jared Shurin and Anne C. Perry)
"The Unwanted Women of Surrey" (2012) in Queen Victoria's Book of Spells (ed. Ellen Datlow)
"Blood is Blood" (2013) in Twisted Histories (ed. Scott Harrison)
"Eleanor Atkins is Dead and Her House is Boarded Up" (2014) in SQ Mag Edition 14 (ed. Sophie Yorkston)
"Exurbia" (2021) in Out of the Ruins, edited by Preston Grassman, Titan Books

Reprints in Year's Best Anthologies
"The River of Memory" (2012) in Year's Best Australian Fantasy and Horror (Ticonderoga Publications, ed. Talie Helene)
"All You Can Do Is Breathe" (2012) in Year's Best Horror and Fantasy (Prime Books, ed. Paula Guran)
"All You Can Do Is Breathe" (2012) in Najlepsze horrory (Best Horror Stories) anthology (Poland) (ed. Bartlomiej Paszylk)
"That Girl" (2011) in Year's Best Australian Fantasy and Horror anthology (Ticonderoga Publications, ed. Talie Helene)
"The Census-Taker's Tale" (2010) in Year's Best Science Fiction and Fantasy anthology (Mirrordanse Books, ed. Bill Congreve and Michelle Marquardt)
"Polish" (2010) in Best Horror anthology (ASIM, ed. Juliet Bathory and Mark Farrugia)
"The Gaze Dogs of Nine Waterfall" (2010) in Year's Best Horror 2 anthology (NightShade Books, ed. Ellen Datlow)
"Dead Sea Fruit" (2006) in Year's Best Horror and Fantasy 20 (Tor Books, ed. Ellen Datlow, Gavin Grant and Kelly Link)
"Dead Sea Fruit" (2006) in Year's Best Science Fiction and Fantasy (Mirrordanse Books, ed. Bill Congreve and Michelle Marquardt)
"Fresh Young Widow" (2006) in Year's Best Horror (Brimstone Press, ed. Angela Challis)
"Fresh Young Widow" (2006) in Year's Best Science Fiction and Fantasy (Mirrordanse Books, ed. Bill Congreve and Michelle Marquardt)

Awards

Wins

Nominations

References

External links

 Official website
 Kaaron Warren Interview by Ben Peek
 Kaaron Warren Interview for Horrorscope

Year of birth missing (living people)
Living people
Australian fantasy writers
Australian science fiction writers
Australian women short story writers
Australian horror writers
Women science fiction and fantasy writers
Women horror writers
Australian women novelists
21st-century Australian novelists
21st-century Australian women writers
21st-century Australian short story writers